"3 Local Boys" is a group famous for their parody songs such as "I'm a Filipino" and their hit "I'm So Hungry", a parody of 2 Live Crew's "Me So Horny" that played over Hawaiian local airwaves. The group released their first album, "Radio Will Nevah Be Da Same", in 1989.

History 

The 3 Local Boyz was a short-lived local Hawaiian radio disc jockey group on the I-94 (KIKI-FM) radio station from the late 1980s to the 1990s, known by their nicknames "Jimmy Da Geek" (James Bender), Lanai Boyee (Grant Tabura), and Alan "da Cruzah" Oda, with Matt Young as record producer and recorder.  Hawaiian Ryan (Ryan Matsumoto), featured on their album, attended Kaiser High School where he met both Lanai Boyee and Jimmy Da Geek. Oda then left the group and was replaced by Matsumoto.  They have produced parody songs on their 1990 album Rasta Revolution that can be described as being FOBish.

The 3 Local Boyz then became the 2 Local Boyz with Lanai Boyee and Jimmy Da Geek releasing another album.  Then Jimmy Da Geek left I-94 and was replaced by comedian Augie T. (or Augie Tulba). The new duo released a CD called Home in da Housing.

All individuals have moved on. Jimmy Da Geek has gone on to radio for KCCN-FM then KQMQ-FM and released his own solo album, titled So So Haolefied.  He now resides in Mesa, Arizona. Alan "da Cruzah" Oda later became a radio executive, went to California and Arizona, then retired from radio and moved home to Hilo.  Hawaiian Ryan too released his own album (Saving Ryan's Privates) and did Christian rock while pursuing comedy. His radio career landed him at stations like KQMQ and KPHW.  He now works for WRDW-FM in Philadelphia.  Lanai went on to radio for KDNN.

Augie T was elected to represent District 9 of the Honolulu City Council on November 3, 2020.

Discography

Rasta Revolution 

Year: 1990
Genre: Comedy, Rap, Hip-Hop
Label: Hip Jam Records
Producers: Jimmy the Geek, Lanai Boy, and featuring Hawaiian Ryan
Recorded Media: Cassette tape

Home in da Housing 
Year: 1995
Genre: Comedy
Label: Tropical Records
Recorded Media: CD, Cassette tape
Note: 2 Local Boyz

Soul Braddah 
Year: 1995
Recorded Media: CD, Cassette tape
Note: 2 Local Boyz

Other releases

References 

American parodists
Musical groups from Hawaii
Parody musicians